The Ralph W. Gerard Award of the Society for Neuroscience (SfN) is an award in neuroscience awarded annually since 1978 for Lifetime Achievement. It is the highest recognition conferred by the SfN. As of 2018, the prize winner receives US$25,000.

It is named in memory of the American neurophysiologist Ralph Waldo Gerard (1900-1974), a founder and honorary president of the Society for Neuroscience and a professor at the University of Chicago , the University of Michigan and the University of California at Irvine. Gerard was known for his work on the nervous system, psychopharmacology, and biological basis of schizophrenia.

Recipients
1978 Stephen William Kuffler
1979 Roger Sperry
1980 Vernon Mountcastle
1981 Herbert Jasper
1982 , Clinton N. Woolsey
1983 Walle Nauta
1984 Theodore H. Bullock, Susumu Hagiwara
1985 Viktor Hamburger, Rita Levi-Montalcini
1986 Seymour Solomon Kety
1987 Brenda Milner
1988 Horace Winchell Magoun, Donald B. Lindsley
1989 Seymour Benzer
1990 Bernard Katz, Sanford L. Palay
1991 Bert Sakmann, Erwin Neher
1992 Julius Axelrod
1993 David Hubel, Torsten Wiesel
1994 Paul Greengard
1995 Hans Thoenen, Eric M. Shooter
1996 Louis Sokoloff
1997 Eric Kandel
1998 Edward R. Perl
1999 Charles F. Stevens
2000 Solomon Halbert Snyder
2001 William Maxwell Cowan
2002 Patricia Goldman-Rakic, Paško Rakić
2003 A. James Hudspeth
2004 Masakazu Konishi, Nobuo Suga
2005 Sten Grillner, Eve Marder
2006 Horace Barlow, Robert Henry Wurtz
2007 Friedrich Bonhoeffer, Nicole Marthe Le Douarin
2008 Mortimer Mishkin, Marcus Raichle
2009 Lily Jan, Yuh Nung Jan
2010 Ricardo Miledi
2011 Carla Shatz
2012 Colin Blakemore
2013 Carol A. Barnes
2014 Roger Andrew Nicoll, Richard Tsien
2015 Story Landis
2016 Ben Barres, Thomas Jessell
2017 
2018 Rodolfo Llinas
2019 Michael E. Greenberg, Catherine Dulac
2020 György Buzsáki
2021 Richard L. Huganir
2022 Jon Kaas

See also
 List of neuroscience awards
 The Brain Prize
 Golden Brain Award
 The Kavli Prize in Neuroscience
 W. Alden Spencer Award
 Karl Spencer Lashley Award
 The Mind & Brain Prize
 Gruber Prize in Neuroscience

References

External links
 Society for Neuroscience 

American science and technology awards
Neuroscience awards
Awards established in 1978
1978 establishments in the United States